Elizabeth Putnam may refer to:

Elizabeth Putnam (figure skater) (born 1984), Canadian competitive figure skater
Elizabeth Cushman Titus Putnam (born 1933), American conservationist and founder of the Student Conservation Association
Elizabeth Lowell Putnam (1862–1935), American philanthropist and activist for prenatal care
Elizabeth Putnam Sohier (1847–1926), a member of Boston's wealthy class, librarian, and library advocate